Ostro was one of eight s built for the  (Royal Italian Navy) during the 1920s. She was named after a southerly wind, Ostro, common in the Mediterranean and Adriatic. The ship played a minor role in the Spanish Civil War of 1936–1937, supporting the Nationalists.

Design and description 
The Turbine-class destroyers were enlarged and improved versions of the preceding  s. Their complement was 12 officers and 167 enlisted men.

The Turbines were powered by two Parsons geared steam turbines, each driving one propeller shaft using steam supplied by three Thornycroft boilers.

Their main battery consisted of four  guns in two twin-gun turrets, one each fore and aft of the superstructure. Anti-aircraft (AA) defense for the Turbine-class ships was provided by a pair of  AA guns in single mounts amidships and a twin-gun mount for  machine guns. They were equipped with six  torpedo tubes in two triple mounts amidships. The Turbines could carry 52 mines.

Construction and career 

Ostro was laid down by Gio. Ansaldo & C. at their Genoa shipyard on 29 April 1925, launched on 2 January 1928 and completed on 9 October. Upon her completion, Ostro, together with other vessels of her class conducted exercises in the Tyrrhenian Sea and visited Monaco to attend the celebrations of the local Italian community. In 1929 she carried out a training cruise of the coast of Spain, and in 1930 another one in the Dodecanese and Aegean Sea.

Spanish Civil War 
After the Civil War started in Spain in July 1936, both Italy and Nazi Germany supported the Nationalists of General Franco, whereas Soviet Union was actively supporting the Republicans. During the first year of the war, the Soviets used the Republican controlled ports of Bilbao and Santander in the North of Spain adjacent to the French border, but after their fall in the summer of 1937, the USSR was forced to use ports in the Mediterranean to continue supplying the Republicans. Both Italy and Germany deployed their submarines in the Mediterranean in early 1937 to interdict with Republican shipping, but without much success. On 3 August 1937 Franco made an urgent plea with Mussolini to use the Italian fleet to prevent the passage of a large Soviet transport convoy, which just departed from Odessa. Originally, only submarines were supposed to be used, but Mussolini was convinced by Franco to use Italian surface ships too against the Soviets.

In the evening of 13 August 1937 Ostro, under command of captain Teodorico Capone, while patrolling off Bizerte, just north of the island of Linosa, spotted and attacked Spanish Republican steamer  sailing from Cartagena to Odessa in ballast. At 20:43 the Spanish ship was struck by a torpedo and sank in the position , off Pantelleria. Twenty-three members of the ship's crew were picked up by the British steamer , and landed in Algiers on 17 August.

On 30 August 1937 , under command of captain Virgilio Rusca, was on patrol together with Ostro, when they encountered Soviet steamer  around 16:00. The destroyers continued shadowing the ship until the darkness fell, and around 21:00  launched two torpedoes at the Soviet vessel, and Ostro launched one. The cargo ship was hit by two torpedoes in quick succession and rapidly sank in the position , approximately 74 miles east of Algiers. Two lifeboats with all 29 survivors were towed to Dellys by local fishing boats, and successfully reached the shore at 01:00 on 31 August. The Soviet steamer was not a blockade runner, and was transporting 2,834 tons of coal from Cardiff to Port Said.

On 3 September Ostro escorted the Republican freighter , which had been captured nationalist members of her crew, from Cagliari to Cape Spartivento where the ship was transferred into the custody of the Nationalist armed merchant cruiser Jaime I who took the freighter to Palma de Mallorca. The merchant was later converted into an auxiliary cruiser on Franco's navy service.

In September 1937 the Nyon Conference was called by France and Great Britain to address the "underwater piracy" conducted against merchant traffic in the Mediterranean. On 14 September an agreement was signed establishing British and French patrol zones around Spain (with a total of 60 destroyers and airforce employed) to counteract aggressive behavior by submarines. Italy was not directly accused, but had to comply with the agreement and suspend the maritime operations.

World War II 

At the time of Italy entrance into World War II on 10 June 1940, Ostro together with sister ships ,  and  formed 2nd Destroyer Squadron based at Taranto.

The three vessels were to transport to Tobruk two anti-aircraft batteries (10 Breda Model 35 cannons in all),  of ammunition (450,000 rounds) and 162 members of the Voluntary Militia for Territorial Security.

The Italian destroyers were theoretically faster than the British cruisers, but due to their age and heavy cargo on board their speed advantage was nullified. In addition, 's third boiler turned out to be defective, limiting the destroyer's speed to just . In fact, Italians drew first blood, when a single Italian  shell hit  just 3 ft above the waterline, with splinters penetrating the warheads of two torpedoes, but caused little damage otherwise. Despite heavy firing,  was not hit until 20:00, when her engine rooms were struck bringing the vessel to a stop. The 7th Squadron expended about 5,000 shells, more than 1,600 of main caliber, before the Italian destroyer was sunk, after 130 minutes of fierce fighting.  rescued 47 out of 225 men from the Italian destroyer, and thirty six more escaped on rafts, but only six of them were later found alive by Italian submarine  almost 20 days later. Captain Baroni died aboard his ship, and was posthumously awarded the Medaglia d´oro al valor militare.

In the morning of 29 June 1940 Ostro and  arrived in Benghazi before proceeding to Tobruk where they arrived on 1 July.

Another Italian convoy sailed to Tobruk on 30 June 1940 from Augusta carrying troops, supplies, ammunition and fuel. The convoy consisted of six cargo and passenger ships and was escorted by 6 destroyers and 4 torpedo boats. The Royal Navy failed to intercept this convoy, in large part due to the large ammunition expenditure in their previous confrontation. On 5 July 1940 there were seven s berthed in Tobruk harbor together with four torpedo boats, six freighters and several auxiliary vessels. Between 10:00 to 11:15 a Short Sunderland reconnaissance plane overflew the harbor at an altitude of 1,500-2,000 meters and despite the anti-aircraft fire opened against it, confirmed the presence of numerous ships in the harbor. In the late afternoon a group of nine Fairey Swordfish torpedo bombers of 813 Naval Air Squadron took off from the airfield in Sidi Barrani and headed towards Tobruk. The air alarm was sounded at 20:06 but the Italians failed to detect the Allied aircraft until they were already over the harbor at 20:20. Destroyers had most of their personnel on board steamers Liguria and Sabbia with exception of dedicated air defense crews. The attack commenced a few minutes later, and lasted only seven minutes and resulted in five Italian ships being sunk or damaged. Not encountering any aerial opposition, British torpedo bombers attacked from low altitude (around 100 feet), and released their torpedoes from 400–500 meters away, almost point-blank.  was attacked first by a plane piloted by Nicholas Kennedy, whose torpedo hit the destroyer in the bow, around the ammunition depot, between the bridge and a 120 mm cannon. The explosion broke the ship into two and sank it half an hour later. Freighter  was also hit, capsized and sank, while  and steamer  were hit, and had to be beached, and the ocean liner  was hit and damaged. Two planes also attacked other destroyers, but failed to launch their torpedoes due to intense anti-aircraft fire. The air alarm was canceled at 21:31, and by that time all nine British planes were far away.

Sinking 
On 19 July 1940 British command, believing that the light cruiser , damaged during the Battle of Cape Spada, had taken refuge in Tobruk, decided to launch a new bomber attack against the base. Around 17:00 twelve Bristol Blenheim bombers from 55 Squadron and 211 Squadron RAF bombed the northern part of the harbor, slightly damaging an anti-aircraft battery and the port's facilities, and losing one aircraft. At 18:56 a seaplane from the 700 Naval Air Squadron launched by the British battleship  appeared to investigate results of the bombing. The seaplane was immediately targeted by anti-aircraft batteries, and shot down. At 21:54 Tobruk was put on alert again after receiving reports from the Bardia and Sidi Belafarid advanced listening stations. Around 22:30 6 Fairey Swordfish torpedo bombers from the 824 Naval Air Squadron FAA appeared in the skies above Tobruk harbor and were met with strong anti-aircraft fire. This forced the planes to make several passes over the area trying to avoid the fire, and also to acquire the targets, the situation exacerbated by a fairly cloudy night. The British finally managed to sort out their objectives by about 01:30 on 20 July and assumed attack formation at low altitude. At 01:32 steamer  was struck in the stern by a torpedo, launched from a plane, piloted by squadron commander F.S. Quarry, causing her to slowly sink. At 01:34 Ostro was hit in her stern ammunition depot by a torpedo launched from a plane piloted by S. F. Fullmore, causing the ship to go ablaze and sink ten minutes later.  was hit by a torpedo at 01:37 and sank. The British lost one plane in the attack which crash-landed on the way back in the Italian controlled territory.

Ostro'''s crew suffered 42 casualties, with 2 officers and 40 NCOs and sailors being missing or killed in the attack. 20 more people were wounded, including commander Zarpellon.

Notes

Bibliography

External links 
 Ostro (1928) Marina Militare website

Turbine-class destroyers
World War II destroyers of Italy
1928 ships
Ships built by Gio. Ansaldo & C.
Ships built in Genoa
Maritime incidents in July 1940
World War II shipwrecks in the Mediterranean Sea
Destroyers sunk by aircraft
Ships sunk by British aircraft
Naval magazine explosions